Canala is a genus of South Pacific intertidal spiders that was first described by Michael R. Gray in 1992.  it contains only three species, all found in New Caledonia: C. longipes, C. magna, and C. poya.

References

Araneomorphae genera
Desidae